Beret a soft, round, flat-crowned hat.

Beret may also refer to:

Places
Beret, Hungary, a village in Borsod-Abaúj-Zemplén County in northeastern Hungary
Baqueira-Beret, a ski resort located in the heart of the Pyrenees, in the Aran Valley and Àneu Valley Lleida, Spain

People
Beret (singer) (born 1996), Spanish pop singer

See also
Blue Berets, a musical group, part of the Russian Federation Ministry of Defence as part of Song and Dance Ensemble of the airborne troops of Russia
Brown Berets or Los Boinas Cafes, a pro-Chicano organization that emerged during the Chicano Movement in the late 1960s
Green beret (disambiguation)
The Red Beret aka The Red Devils, The Big Jump and retitled Paratrooper for the US release, a 1953 Technicolor British war film